Esperidião Amin Helou Filho (December 21, 1947) is a Brazilian politician. Born to a family of businessmen and politicians of Lebanese origin, he was twice elected governor of the state of Santa Catarina and  twice mayor of the city of Florianópolis, its capital. He was Senator of the Republic between 1991 and 1999 and national president of the Progressive Party. In 1994, he ran for President of Brazil, but was not elected. He is married to Angela Amin, a federal congresswoman in the National Congress of Brazil and twice mayor of Florianópolis.

Amin studied Business Administration and Law at Universidade Federal de Santa Catarina (UFSC). He completed his master's degree in management and is a professor in the areas of business, economics, law and planning at UFSC.

See also
 List of mayors of Florianópolis

References
Esperidião Amin 
Angela Amin 
Angela Amin Official Website 

|-

|-

|-

|-

|-

1947 births
Living people
People from Florianópolis
Brazilian people of Lebanese descent
National Renewal Alliance politicians
Democratic Social Party politicians
Reform Progressive Party politicians
Progressistas politicians
Members of the Federal Senate (Brazil)
Members of the Chamber of Deputies (Brazil) from Santa Catarina
Governors of Santa Catarina (state)
Mayors of places in Brazil
Candidates for President of Brazil
Brazilian businesspeople